Tomas Hornos (born September 15, 1988 in Argentina), is a world class sailor in the Star and Snipe classes.

He was the youngest skipper to win the Snipe World Championship by winning the title on his 19th birthday in 2007, and also the youngest sailor to be nominated for the US Sailor of the Year Awards, in 2008.

After sailing in the Optimist and Snipe classes, he moved to the Star class and was the top junior sailor at the 2010 Star World Championship in Rio de Janeiro (Brazil). He was third at the 2011 North Americans in Tampa, Florida, and runner-up in 2014 in Oxford, Maryland. He won the 2012 Western Hemisphere Championship in Annapolis, Maryland.

Back to the Snipe class, he was national champion in 2019.

References

External links 
Tomas Hornos page. Star Sailors League

1988 births
Tufts Jumbos sailors
Living people
Snipe class sailors
Snipe class world champions
American male sailors (sport)